Bihat State was a princely state in India during the British Raj, controlled by the Bundelkhand Agency.

Raos of Bihat State
The rulers of Bihat State were called Raos.
Diwan Aparbal Singh, before 1807-1807
Rao Bankat Rao, 1807-1828
Rao Kamod Singh, 1828-1846
Hardi Sah 1846-1859
Govind Das 1859-1872
Rao Mahum Singh 1872-after 1892

See also
Political integration of India

References

Princely states of India
1806 establishments in India
1950 disestablishments in India